Derby day generally refers to any sporting event featuring a pair of sports teams engaged in a local rivalry. (The term originated from association football, for the day when a certain local derby takes place.)

Derby Day specifically may refer to:

Sports
 Epsom Derby, at Epsom Downs Racecourse, England (the original and definitive use of the term referring to the classic race founded in 1780 by Lord Derby)
 Derby Day (UK), an annual rugby match between University of East Anglia and University of Essex
 Australia-New Zealand sports rivalries aka Trans-Tasman Derby, match days in several sports between Australia and New Zealand
 India-Pakistan cricket rivalry aka IndoPak Derby, a match day between India and Pakistan
 Kentucky Derby, a horse race in the United States
 Kolkata Derby, a football match day between Indian clubs Mohun Bagan and East Bengal in Kolkata 
 New Zealand Derby
 Victoria Derby, during the Melbourne Spring Racing Carnival, Australia

Arts
 Derby Day (1923 film), Our Gang short 
 Derby Day (1952 film), a British drama film directed by Herbert Wilcox
 Derby Day (light opera), a 1931 light opera
 The Derby Day, an 1858 painting by William Powell Frith